In electromagnetism, displacement current density is the quantity  appearing in Maxwell's equations that is defined in terms of the rate of change of , the electric displacement field. Displacement current density has the same units as electric current density, and it is a source of the magnetic field just as actual current is. However it is not an electric current of moving charges, but a time-varying electric field.  In physical materials (as opposed to vacuum), there is also a contribution from the slight motion of charges bound in atoms, called dielectric polarization.

The idea was conceived by James Clerk Maxwell in his 1861 paper On Physical Lines of Force, Part III in connection with the displacement of electric particles in a dielectric medium. Maxwell added displacement current to the electric current term in Ampère's Circuital Law.  In his 1865 paper A Dynamical Theory of the Electromagnetic Field Maxwell used this amended version of Ampère's Circuital Law to derive the electromagnetic wave equation. This derivation is now generally accepted as a historical landmark in physics by virtue of uniting electricity, magnetism and optics into one single unified theory.  The displacement current term is now seen as a crucial addition that completed Maxwell's equations and is necessary to explain many phenomena, most particularly the existence of electromagnetic waves.

Explanation 

The electric displacement field is defined as:

where:
  is the permittivity of free space;
  is the electric field intensity; and
  is the polarization of the medium.

Differentiating this equation with respect to time defines the displacement current density, which therefore has two components in a dielectric:(see also the "displacement current" section of the article "current density")

The first term on the right hand side is present in material media and in free space. It doesn't necessarily come from any actual movement of charge, but it does have an associated magnetic field, just as a current does due to charge motion. Some authors apply the name displacement current to the first term by itself.

The second term on the right hand side, called polarization current density, comes from the change in polarization of the individual molecules of the dielectric material. Polarization results when, under the influence of an applied electric field, the charges in molecules have moved from a position of exact cancellation. The positive and negative charges in molecules separate, causing an increase in the state of polarization .  A changing state of polarization corresponds to charge movement and so is equivalent to a current, hence the term "polarization current". Thus,

This polarization is the displacement current as it was originally conceived by Maxwell. Maxwell made no special treatment of the vacuum, treating it as a material medium.

The modern justification of displacement current is explained below.

Isotropic dielectric case
In the case of a very simple dielectric material the constitutive relation holds:

where the permittivity  is the product of:
 , the permittivity of free space, or the electric constant; and
 , the relative permittivity of the dielectric.

In the equation above, the use of    accounts for
the polarization (if any) of the dielectric material.

The scalar value of displacement current may also be expressed in terms of electric flux:

The forms in terms of scalar    are correct only for linear isotropic materials. For linear non-isotropic materials,   becomes a matrix; even more generally,    may be replaced by a tensor, which may depend upon the electric field itself, or may exhibit frequency dependence (hence dispersion).

For a linear isotropic dielectric, the polarization  is given by:

where   is known as the susceptibility of the dielectric to electric fields. Note that

Necessity
Some implications of the displacement current follow, which agree with experimental observation, and with the requirements of logical consistency for the theory of electromagnetism.

Generalizing Ampère's circuital law

Current in capacitors
An example illustrating the need for the displacement current arises in connection with capacitors with no medium between the plates. Consider the charging capacitor in the figure. The capacitor is in a circuit that causes equal and opposite charges to appear on the left plate and the right plate, charging the capacitor and increasing the electric field between its plates. No actual charge is transported through the vacuum between its plates. Nonetheless, a magnetic field exists between the plates as though a current were present there as well. One explanation is that a displacement current  "flows" in the vacuum, and this current produces the magnetic field in the region between the plates according to Ampère's law:

where
  is the closed line integral around some closed curve ;
  is the magnetic field measured in teslas;
  is the vector dot product;
  is the magnetic constant, also called the permeability of free space; and
  is the net displacement current that passes through a small surface bounded by the curve .

The magnetic field between the plates is the same as that outside the plates, so the displacement current must be the same as the conduction current in the wires, that is,

which extends the notion of current beyond a mere transport of charge.

Next, this displacement current is related to the charging of the capacitor. Consider the current in the imaginary cylindrical surface shown surrounding the left plate. A current, say , passes outward through the left surface  of the cylinder, but no conduction current (no transport of real charges) crosses the right surface . Notice that the electric field  between the plates increases as the capacitor charges. That is, in a manner described by Gauss's law, assuming no dielectric between the plates:

where  refers to the imaginary cylindrical surface. Assuming a parallel plate capacitor with uniform electric field, and neglecting fringing effects around the edges of the plates, according to charge conservation equation

where the first term has a negative sign because charge leaves surface   (the charge is decreasing), the last term has a positive sign because unit vector of surface  is from left to right while the direction of electric field is from right to left,  is the area of the surface . The electric field at surface  is zero because surface  is in the outside of the capacitor. Under the assumption of a uniform electric field distribution inside the capacitor, the displacement current density D is found by dividing by the area of the surface:

where    is the current leaving the cylindrical surface (which must equal D) and D  is the flow of charge per unit area into the cylindrical surface through the face .

Combining these results, the magnetic field is found using the integral form of Ampère's law with an arbitrary choice of contour provided the displacement current density term is added to the conduction current density (the Ampère-Maxwell equation):

This equation says that the integral of the magnetic field  around the edge  of a surface  is equal to the integrated current  through any surface with the same edge, plus the displacement current term  through whichever surface. 

As depicted in the figure to the right, the current crossing surface  is entirely conduction current. Applying the Ampère-Maxwell equation to surface  yields:

However, the current crossing surface  is entirely displacement current. Applying this law to surface , which is bounded by exactly the same curve , but lies between the plates, produces:

Any surface   that intersects the wire has current  passing through it so Ampère's law gives the correct magnetic field. However a second surface  bounded by the same edge   could be drawn passing between the capacitor plates, therefore having no current passing through it. Without the displacement current term Ampere's law would give zero magnetic field for this surface. Therefore, without the displacement current term Ampere's law gives inconsistent results, the magnetic field would depend on the surface chosen for integration. Thus the displacement current term  is necessary as a second source term which gives the correct magnetic field when the surface of integration passes between the capacitor plates. Because the current is increasing the charge on the capacitor's plates, the electric field between the plates is increasing, and the rate of change of electric field gives the correct value for the field  found above.

Mathematical formulation
In a more mathematical vein, the same results can be obtained from the underlying differential equations. Consider for simplicity a non-magnetic medium where the relative magnetic permeability is unity, and the complication of magnetization current (bound current) is absent, so that  and 
The current leaving a volume must equal the rate of decrease of charge in a volume. In differential form this continuity equation becomes:

where the left side is the divergence of the free current density and the right side is the rate of decrease of the free charge density. However, Ampère's law in its original form states:

which implies that the divergence of the current term vanishes, contradicting the continuity equation. (Vanishing of the divergence is a result of the mathematical identity that states the divergence of a curl is always zero.) This conflict is removed by addition of the displacement current, as then:

and

which is in agreement with the continuity equation because of Gauss's law:

Wave propagation
The added displacement current also leads to wave propagation by taking the curl of the equation for magnetic field.

Substituting this form for  into Ampère's law, and assuming there is no bound or free current density contributing to :

with the result:

However,

leading to the wave equation:

where use is made of the vector identity that holds for any vector field :

and the fact that the divergence of the magnetic field is zero. An identical wave equation can be found for the electric field by taking the curl:

The electric field can be expressed in the general form:

The  component on the right hand side is the Gauss's law component, and this is the component that is relevant to the conservation of charge argument above.

History and interpretation 

Maxwell's displacement current was postulated in part III of his 1861 paper ''. Few topics in modern physics have caused as much confusion and misunderstanding as that of displacement current.  This is in part due to the fact that Maxwell used a sea of molecular vortices in his derivation, while modern textbooks operate on the basis that displacement current can exist in free space. Maxwell's derivation is unrelated to the modern day derivation for displacement current in the vacuum, which is based on consistency between Ampere's circuital law for the magnetic field and the continuity equation for electric charge.

Maxwell's purpose is stated by him at (Part I, p. 161):

He is careful to point out the treatment is one of analogy:

In part III, in relation to displacement current, he says

Clearly Maxwell was driving at magnetization even though the same introduction clearly talks about dielectric polarization.

Maxwell concluded, using Newton's equation for the speed of sound (Lines of Force, Part III, equation (132)), that "light consists of transverse undulations in the same medium that is the cause of electric and magnetic phenomena."

But although the above quotations point towards a magnetic explanation for displacement current, for example, based upon the divergence of the above curl equation, Maxwell's explanation ultimately stressed linear polarization of dielectrics:

With some change of symbols (and units) combined with the results deduced in the section  (and the material constant  these equations take the familiar form between a parallel plate capacitor with uniform electric field, and neglecting fringing effects around the edges of the plates:

When it came to deriving the electromagnetic wave equation from displacement current in his 1865 paper A Dynamical Theory of the Electromagnetic Field, he got around the problem of the non-zero divergence associated with Gauss's law and dielectric displacement by eliminating the Gauss term and deriving the wave equation exclusively for the solenoidal magnetic field vector.

Maxwell's emphasis on polarization diverted attention towards the electric capacitor circuit, and led to the common belief that Maxwell conceived of displacement current so as to maintain conservation of charge in an electric capacitor circuit. There are a variety of debatable notions about Maxwell's thinking, ranging from his supposed desire to perfect the symmetry of the field equations to the desire to achieve compatibility with the continuity equation.

See also
Electromagnetic wave equation
Ampère's circuital law
Capacitance

References

Maxwell's papers
On Faraday's Lines of Force Maxwell's paper of 1855
 Maxwell's paper of 1861
  Maxwell's paper of 1864

Further reading
AM Bork Maxwell, Displacement Current, and Symmetry (1963)
AM Bork Maxwell and the Electromagnetic Wave Equation (1967)

External links

Electric current
Electricity concepts
Electrodynamics
Electromagnetism